Gubernatorial elections were held in the Philippines on May 9, 2016. All provinces elected their provincial governors for three-year terms, who will be inaugurated on June 30, 2016, after their proclamation. Governors that are currently serving their third consecutive terms are prohibited from running as governors (they may run for any other posts however).

Highly urbanized cities and independent component cities such as Angeles City, Bacolod, Baguio, Cagayan de Oro, Cebu City, Davao City, Iloilo City and Metro Manila with the municipality of Pateros are outside the jurisdiction of any province and thus would not run elections for governors of their mother provinces (Pampanga, Negros Occidental, Benguet, Misamis Oriental, Cebu, Davao del Sur and Iloilo  for Angeles, Bacolod, Baguio, Cagayan de Oro, Cebu City, Davao City and Iloilo City, respectively). These cities and Pateros would elect mayors instead.

Davao Occidental held its first gubernatorial election on this day.

Summary

Luzon

Ilocos Region

Ilocos Norte
Incumbent governor Imee Marcos is running for reelection unopposed.

Ilocos Sur
Incumbent governor Ryan Singson is running for reelection unopposed.

La Union
Incumbent Governor Manuel Ortega is term limited

Pangasinan
Incumbent Governor Amado Espino, Jr. is term limited

Cagayan Valley

Batanes
Incumbent Vicente Gato is running for reelection

Cagayan
Incumbent Governor Alvaro Antonio is term limited

Isabela
Incumbent Governor Faustino Dy III is running for reelection.

Nueva Vizcaya
Incumbent Governor Ruth Padilla is running for Congresswoman.

Quirino
Incumbent governor Junie Cua is running for reelection unopposed.

Cordillera Administrative Region

Abra
Incumbent Governor Eustaquio Bersamin is term limited

Apayao
Incumbent governor Elias Bulut, Jr. is running for reelection unopposed.

Benguet
Incumbent Governor Nestor Fongwan is term limited

Ifugao
Incumbent Denis Habawel is running for reelection

Kalinga
Incumbent Jocel Baac is running for reelection

Mountain Province
Incumbent Governor Leonard Mayaen was running unopposed for reelection to a third term, but died in office from a heart attack on March 31, 2016. His daughter, Kathy Jyll, is the substitute candidate.

Central Luzon

Aurora
Incumbent governor Gerardo Noveras is running for reelection unopposed.

Bataan
Incumbent governor Albert Garcia is running for reelection unopposed.

Bulacan
Incumbent governor Wilhelmino Sy-Alvarado is running for re-election.

Nueva Ecija
Incumbent Governor Aurelio Umali is term limited and is running for congressman for Nueva Ecija's 3rd District.

Pampanga
Incumbent governor Lilia Pineda is running for reelection unopposed.

Tarlac
Incumbent Governor Victor Yap is term limited

Zambales
Incumbent Hermogenes Ebdane is running for reelection

Calabarzon

Batangas
Incumbent Governor Vilma Santos Recto is term limited and is running for Congress. Her party nominated incumbent Vice Governor Mark Leviste.

Cavite
Current provincial governor Jonvic Remulla will not run for reelection.

Laguna
The current governor, Ramil Hernandez, the former vice-governor, will run for his first full term against ex-governor ER Ejercito, who was unseated in 2014 by a COMELEC decision.

Quezon

≥u

Rizal

Mimaropa

Marinduque

Occidental Mindoro

Oriental Mindoro

Palawan

Romblon

Bicol Region

Albay
Incumbent Governor Joey Salceda is term limited.

Camarines Norte

Camarines Sur

Catanduanes

Masbate

Sorsogon

Visayas

Western Visayas

Aklan

Antique
Exequiel Javier is the incumbent governor. However, in January 2015, the Commission on Elections en banc disqualifies Javier (voting 4-2) for violating the Omnibus Election Code after suspending Valderrama, Antique Mayor Joyce Roquero. The then Vice Governor, Rhodora Cadiao assumed the vacated Office of Antique Provincial Governor on February 3, 2015 after the Department of Interior and Local Government imposed the disqualification. However, on January 12, 2016; The Supreme Court overruled and reversed the decision of the Commission on Elections en banc, reinstating Javier into office on March 28, 2016.

Capiz
Incumbent Governor Victor Tanco, Sr. is term limited

Guimaras

Iloilo

Negros Island Region

Negros Occidental
Incumbent governor Alfredo Marañon, Jr. is running for reelection unopposed.

Negros Oriental

Central Visayas

Bohol

Cebu

Siquijor

Eastern Visayas

Biliran
Incumbent governor Gerardo Espina, Jr. is running for reelection unopposed.

Eastern Samar

Leyte

Northern Samar

Samar

Southern Leyte

Mindanao

Zamboanga Peninsula

Zamboanga del Norte

Zamboanga del Sur

Zamboanga Sibugay

Northern Mindanao

Bukidnon

Camiguin
Incumbent Governor Jurdin Jesus Romualdo is term limited and is running for Mayor of Mambajao.

Lanao del Norte
Incumbent Governor Mohamad Khalid Dimaporo is term limited.

Misamis Occidental

Misamis Oriental

Davao Region

Compostela Valley
Incumbent Governor Arturo Uy is term limited.

Davao del Norte
Incumbent Governor Rodolfo del Rosario, Sr. is term limited.

Davao del Sur

Davao Occidental
The first governor of Davao Occidental will be determined. Since Claude Bautista was the sole candidate, he will stand unopposed for election.

Davao Oriental
Incumbent Governor Corazon Malanyaon is term limited.

Soccksargen

Cotabato

Sarangani

South Cotabato

Sultan Kudarat
Incumbent Governor Suharto Mangudadatu is term limited.

Caraga

Agusan Del Norte

Agusan del Sur

Dinagat Islands

Surigao del Norte

Surigao del Sur
Incumbent Governor Johnny Pimentel is running for congressman.

Autonomous Region in Muslim Mindanao

Basilan
Incumbent Governor Jum Jainudin Akbar is term limited.

Lanao del Sur
Incumbent Governor Mamintal Alonto Adiong Jr. is term limited.

Maguindanao

Sulu

Tawi-Tawi

Notes

References

2016 Philippine local elections
2016
May 2016 events in the Philippines